Bangladesh competed at the 2016 Asian Beach Games held in Danang, Vietnam from 24 September to 3 October 2016

Competitors

Nations at the 2016 Asian Beach Games
2016 in Bangladeshi sport
Bangladesh at the Asian Beach Games